The 1914 Columbus Panhandles season was their ninth season in existence. The team played in the Ohio League and posted a 7–2 record.

Schedule

Game notes

References
Pro Football Archives: 1914 Columbus Panhandles season

Columbus Panhandles seasons
Columbus Pan
Columbus Pan